Boy on Bridge is an album by Alan Doyle, released in 2012. It was his first solo album. Until then, he had not released a solo album in the 19 years he had been in Great Big Sea.

The album title is a reference to Doyle's IMDb page in which he is credited as an actor in the 1981 TV movie A Whale for the Killing.

Track listing

Chart performance

Singles

The lead single off the album, "I've Seen a Little", was released March 26, 2012, by Universal Music Canada in Canada and Skinner's Hill Music Ltd. in the United States. It is a digital-only release for sale at digital music outlets. The single version of the song is the same version that appears on Boy on Bridge.

References

2012 albums
Alan Doyle albums